Hilde Britt Skarbøvik Mellbye (born April 14, 1961) is a Norwegian businessperson. Having acted as CEO of Norlandia Care since February 2010,  Mellbye was appointed as CEO of the Norwegian government-owned wine and spirits retail monopoly company, AS Vinmonopolet after the death of Kai G. Henriksen, to assume the position on January 1, 2017.

References

1961 births
Living people
Norwegian women business executives
21st-century Norwegian businesswomen
21st-century Norwegian businesspeople